Martín Ernesto Rabuñal Rey (born 22 April 1994) is a Uruguayan professional footballer who plays as a midfielder for Montevideo City Torque.

Career
A youth academy graduate of Defensor Sporting, Rabuñal made his professional debut for the club on 7 December 2014 in a 2–0 league win against Rampla Juniors. He scored his first professional goal on 26 April 2015 in a 2–2 draw against El Tanque Sisley.

In January 2020, Rabuñal joined Mexican club Juárez on a season long loan deal. He left the club in December 2020 after playing 21 matches.

On 3 March 2021, Argentine club Rosario Central announced the signing of Rabuñal on a loan deal until December 2021. On 15 March 2021, he made his debut for the club in a 2–1 cup win against Arsenal de Sarandí. He replaced Rafael Sangiovani on 78th minute of the match and scored a goal four minutes later. Shortly after he arrived he suffered a ruptured anterior cruciate ligament injury in his right knee at the beginning of April (in training). However, the loan spell was extended with one year at the end of December 2021. 

On 31 July 2022, Rabuñal joined Montevideo City Torque, signing a deal until the end of 2023.

References

External links
 

1994 births
Living people
Uruguayan footballers
Uruguayan expatriate footballers
Association football midfielders
Uruguayan Primera División players
Liga MX players
Defensor Sporting players
FC Juárez footballers
Rosario Central footballers
Montevideo City Torque players
Uruguayan expatriate sportspeople in Mexico
Uruguayan expatriate sportspeople in Argentina
Expatriate footballers in Mexico
Expatriate footballers in Argentina